Stolen Face is a 1952 British film noir directed by Terence Fisher and starring Paul Henreid, Lizabeth Scott and André Morell. It was made at Riverside Studios by Hammer Film Productions.

Plot
Dr. Philip Ritter, a plastic surgeon (Paul Henreid), falls in love with a gifted and beautiful concert pianist, Alice Brent (Lizabeth Scott). They meet by chance at a country inn, and romance soon develops. However, Alice is already engaged to be married and, afraid to tell Ritter, runs away. Ritter is devastated.

Back at his London surgery, Ritter receives a phone call from Alice, who informs him she is to marry David (André Morell). Meanwhile, Ritter's new patient is Lily Conover (Mary Mackenzie), a female convict whose face is disfigured. The love-struck surgeon believes he can change her criminal ways by constructing her new face to resemble that of Alice. He does so, and they marry. (Now identical to Alice, she is played by Scott.)

However, Lily has not changed her ways. She soon grows bored of Ritter's sedate lifestyle, and returns to a life of crime and partying. She is reckless in her behaviour, and unabashedly flirtatious with other men, and he comes to despise her.

As Alice completes her latest concert tour, David knows there is something wrong with her. He guesses she is in love with someone else, and calls off the engagement. Alice goes to see Ritter, who confesses what he has done.

Later, an upset Ritter leaves London for Plymouth, believing that the situation can never be reversed. Lily follows him, however, and takes the same train, where she becomes drunk and aggressive towards Ritter. Alice believes Ritter is so upset he may harm Lily, or even kill her if provoked, and she too joins the train. She arrives just as the two are arguing, and engaged in a physical struggle as Ritter tries to prevent the intoxicated Lily from falling out of the carriage. As Alice enters, Lily accidentally falls against the loose carriage door, and falls out of the train.

The film ends as Lily is discovered dead at the side of the tracks, and Ritter and Alice are reunited.

Cast

 Paul Henreid as Dr. Philip Ritter
 Lizabeth Scott as Alice Brent / Lily Conover, after surgery
 André Morell as David
 Mary Mackenzie as Lily Conover, before surgery
 John Wood as Dr. John 'Jack' Wilson
 Arnold Ridley as Dr. Russell
 Susan Stephen as Betty
 Diana Beaumont as May
 Terence O'Regan as Pete Snipe
 Russell Napier as Det. Cutler
 Ambrosine Phillpotts as Miss Patten - Fur Department Clerk 
 Everley Gregg as Lady Millicent Harringay
 Cyril Smith as Alf Bixby, Innkeeper
 Richard Wattis as Mr. Wentworth, Store Manager
 Dorothy Bramhall as Miss Simpson - Receptionist
 	Janet Burnell as 	Maggie Bixby
 Alexis France as Mrs. Emmett
 John Bull as Charles Emmett
 Bartlett Mullins as Farmer
 Anna Turner	as	Maid
 John Warren as 	Railway Guard
 Hal Osmond as Photographer

Production
The film was shot at Hammersmith's Riverside Studios at the end of 1951. The film's sets were designed by the art director Wilfred Arnold.

Paul Henreid made the film for a percentage of the profits. It did well enough for him to make another movie for the Lipperts, Mantrap.

References

Bibliography
 Harper, Sue & Porter, Vincent. British Cinema of the 1950s: The Decline of Deference. Oxford University Press, 2007.

External links
 
 

1952 films
1952 crime drama films
British crime drama films
British black-and-white films
Film noir
Hammer Film Productions films
Lippert Pictures films
Films directed by Terence Fisher
Films shot at Riverside Studios
Films set in London
Films set in England
Films scored by Malcolm Arnold
Works about plastic surgery
1950s English-language films
1950s British films